Joe and Sons is an American television sitcom that aired on CBS from September 9, 1975, to January 13, 1976. It ran for a total of 14 episodes.

Premise
The show focused on an Italian-American widower, Joe Vitale, who lived in Hoboken, New Jersey with his two teenage sons, Mark and Nick. Gus Duzik worked with him as a typical middle-class family worker at the Hoboken Sheet and Tube Company. Estelle was a cocktail waitress who lived in the apartment across the hall who helped Joe with his sons and liked to cook an occasional meal for the family.

Cast 
 Richard S. Castellano as Joe Vitale
 Barry Miller as Mark Vitale
 Jimmy Baio as Nick Vitale
 Jerry Stiller as Gus Duzik 
 Bobbi Jordan as Estelle
 Florence Stanley as Aunt Josephine

Episodes

External links
 
 

1975 American television series debuts
1976 American television series endings
CBS original programming
1970s American sitcoms
Hoboken, New Jersey
English-language television shows
Television shows set in New Jersey